Diablo is a Finnish melodic death metal band, formed in 1995 as Diablo Brothers. The band cite Testament, Slayer, Metallica, Megadeth, Opeth, Death, and Meshuggah as influences, but influence from several Gothenburg bands, including Dark Tranquillity, Hypocrisy, and In Flames, is also evident in their music. Their fourth album, Mimic47, was released in January 2006, and reached No. 1 on the Finnish music charts. On 14 May 2008 Diablo released their 5th studio album, Icaros. It reached No. 2 on the Finnish music charts.

Vocalist Rainer Nygård confirmed the release of their latest album Silvër Horizon on a video uploaded by the Metal Festival Nummirock on Facebook. Nygård stated that the album will be released in late 2015.

Members

Current members
Rainer Nygård – vocals, guitar (1995–)
Marko Utriainen – lead guitar (1995–)
Aadolf Virtanen – bass (1995–)
Heikki Malmberg – drums (2000–)

Former member
Timo Kemppainen – drums (1995–2000)

Discography

Albums
 Elegance in Black (2000)
 Renaissance (2002)
 Eternium (2004)
 Mimic47 (2006)
 Icaros (2008)
 Silvër Horizon (2015)
 When All the Rivers Are Silent (2022)

Singles
 "Princess" (1999)
 "Intomesee" (2002)
 "Read My Scars" (2003)
 "Mimic47" (2005)
 "Damien" (2005)
 "Icaros" (2008)
 "Isolation" (2015)
 "Grace Under Pressure" (2019)
 "The Extinctionist" (2020)
 "The Stranger" (2022)

References

External links
 Official Site

Finnish melodic death metal musical groups
Finnish thrash metal musical groups
Musical groups established in 1990